Frances Mary Platt (née Judson)  is a British biochemist and pharmacologist who is a professor at the University of Oxford. Her research investigates rare genetic disorders known as lysosomal storage diseases, progressive conditions that lead to neurodegeneration. She was elected Fellow of the Royal Society in 2021.

Early life and education 
Platt was interested in insects as a child. Her father was a general practitioner. Platt was an undergraduate student at Imperial College London, where she majored in zoology. She moved to the University of Bath for her graduate studies. Her doctoral research looking at the impact of monoclonal antibodies on the prothoracic glands of Manduca sexta. Platt was a postdoctoral researcher at the Washington University School of Medicine, where she investigated how abnormal accumulation of glycosphingolipids. During her final year, her boss moved to the pharmaceutical arm of Monsanto, where Platt became aware of industrial research and antiviral drugs.

Research and career 
In 1996, Platt was appointed as a senior research fellow at the Lister Institute of Preventive Medicine. She moved to the University of Oxford in 2006, where she was named Head of the Department of Pharmacology in 2020.

Platt studies genetic disorders known as lysosomal storage diseases. The lysosome is a compartment within cells that is involved with breaking down large molecules. When it goes wrong, molecules accumulate in the lysosome (so-called “storage,”). Specifically, Platt is particularly interested in the build up of sphingolipids, the build-up of which can cause neurodegeneration. Platt looks to better understand these conditions as well as developing novel therapeutic pathways. In particular, Platt developed substrate reduction therapies. 

Platt identified that a drug she was investigating as an antiviral was effective in treating lysosomal diseases. She managed to get the drug (Miglustat) approved by the European Medicines Agency and Food and Drug Administration for the treatment of both Gaucher's disease and Niemann–Pick disease.

Awards and honours 
 1998 Gaucher Association Alan Gordon award
 1999 Horst-Bickel Award
 2011 Elected Fellow of the Academy of Medical Sciences
 2013 Royal Society Wolfson Merit Award
 2016 Wellcome Trust Investigator
 2018 Elected a Member of the Academia Europaea (MAE)
 2021 Elected Fellow of the Royal Society

Selected publications

Personal life 
Platt has two children.

References 

Living people
Year of birth missing (living people)
People associated with the University of Oxford
Fellows of the Royal Society
British biochemists
British pharmacologists
Alumni of Imperial College London
Alumni of the University of Bath
Fellows of the Academy of Medical Sciences (United Kingdom)